The Complete Set Limited Box is a box set released by South Korean pop group Tohoshinki. It is a series of two Japanese compilation albums released by the Avex sub-label Rhythm Zone on June 30, 2010, two months after former Tohoshinki members Jejung, Yuchun, and Junsu left the band to form JYJ. The first compilation album in the series, Complete: Single A-Side Collection, includes all A-side singles released by Tohoshinki since their Japanese debut in April 2005. The second album, the Single B-Side Collection, consists of twelve popular B-side tracks Tohoshinki released over the years. The two albums were compiled together in the exclusive Complete Set Limited Box, which was also released on June 30, 2010. The limited edition includes a 1,000-piece jigsaw puzzle.

The Complete album series marked the closing releases under their contract with Rhythm Zone.

Chart performance
Complete: Single A-Side Collection debuted at number three on the weekly Oricon Albums Chart, selling 106,265 copies in sixteen weeks. Having shipped more than 100,000 copies, the album was certified gold in June 2010. The Single B-Side Collection debuted at number four on the same chart, selling 100,729 in thirteen weeks.

Track listings

Complete: Single A-Side Collection

Single B-Side Collection

Charts

Certifications

Release history

References 

TVXQ albums
Japanese-language compilation albums
2010 compilation albums
Avex Group compilation albums